Events in the year 1538 in Japan.

Incumbents
Monarch: Go-Nara

Births
January 15 - Maeda Toshiie (d. 1599), general

References

 
1530s in Japan
Japan
Years of the 16th century in Japan